Anatoly Chertkov (17 July 1936 in Tula Oblast – 22 October 2014 in Rostov-on-Don) was a Russian midfield footballer. He was a Master of Sports of the USSR.

Biography 
He debuted professionally in 1958 with the FC SKVO Rostov-on-Don, playing in the Soviet First League. He played with them for nine seasons, scoring 16 goals in 286 matches. He transferred to FC Rostov for a final season, retiring in 1968.

References 

1936 births
2014 deaths
Soviet footballers
Russian footballers
FC Rostov players
Honoured Masters of Sport of the USSR
Association football midfielders
FC SKA Rostov-on-Don players